EuroHockey Indoor Club Cup may refer to:

Men's EuroHockey Indoor Club Cup
Women's EuroHockey Indoor Club Cup